Aadha Full was a 2016 Indian Hindi-language coming-of-age action-drama series created by BBC Media Action in association with UNICEF. The series comprises 78 episodes and was released on DD National in October 2016. Produced by Sunshine Productions, the series starred Richa Soni, Ahsaas Khanna, and Harsh Mayar.

Plot 
Aadha Full is based on social challenges faced by youth of today's generation. The story revolves around three teenager, Adrak, Tara and Kitty who are best friends for each other and live in a small town called Badlapur. These three form a team called Aadha Full to solve mystery and crime cases that take place in their town trying to make their small town a better place to live in. The series addresses coming of age issues such as under-age marriage, sex-selective abortion, dowry, fair skin and beauty myths, sexual health, stereotyping of women and girls.

Cast 
 Neelanshi Singh as Tara
Ahsaas Channa as Kitty
Richa Soni as Roshni
Ishaan Singh Manhas as Arjun
Harsh Mayar as Adrak
 Mallika Ghai as Kamlesh 
Shefali Rana as Beauty aunty
Nabeel Ahmed as Rohan

Production 
The theme of the show was sung by Bollywood playback singer-composer Salim Merchant. Bollywood actress Priyanka Chopra, who is also a UNICEF's National Ambassador, had recorded a special video to send her best wishes to the team of Aadha Full.

References

External links 
 Aadha Full on YouTube

Indian television series
Indian drama television series
Indian action television series